Alex Chapple is a Canadian director and writer.

Filmography

External links
 

Canadian television writers
Canadian television directors
Year of birth missing (living people)
Living people